Unnao is a city in the Indian state of Uttar Pradesh. It is the administrative headquarters of Unnao district and a part of Lucknow division, between Kanpur and Lucknow. Unnao is a large industrial city with three industrial suburbs around it. Unnao has the country's largest leather Export in the UPSIDC.such as Mirza International,Model Tannery, Omega Tannery,Model Exim,Calico Trends,Super Tannery,Amin Tannery and Rahman Industries etc.The city is famous for its leather ,Leather Factories, mosquito net, Zardozi and chemical industries. Unnao is an historical city with many historical buildings and structures. Trans Ganga City, a new satellite town of Unnao is being developed in order to develop Unnao as a major industrial and infrastructural hub as the region comes under Kanpur-Lucknow Counter Magnet Area. Unnao district is a part of Central Ganges Plain of the state covering an area of 4558 km2. The city is enlisted as a municipality of Kanpur metropolitan area and is the second largest city within the metropolitan area. nawabganj pakshi vihar located along NH27 is one of best place to see migratory birds which come from various countries during winter season and it has been included in the list of RAMSAR sites. Best time to visit this sanctuary is from November to March.

History
The district is named after its capital, Unnao. About 900 years ago, the site of this town was covered with extensive forests. Godo Singh, a Chauhan Rajput, cleared the forests probably in the third quarter of the 12th century and founded a town, called Sawai Godo, which shortly afterwards passed into the hands of the rulers of the Kannauj, who appointed Khande Singh as the Governor of the place. Unwant Rai Singh, a Bisen Rajput and a lieutenant of the Governor, killed him and built a fort here, renaming the place as Unnao after himself.. Kavi Kalash (Chandogamatya), Advisor, Commander and a close friend of Chhatrapati Sambhaji Maharaj was born here.

In ancient times, the area which comprises Unnao formed part of the Kosala Mahajanapada. It was later included in Oudh. This region has been inhabited since antiquity as traces from ancient times remain at some places in the district. After the First War of Indian Independence in 1857, power was transferred from the British East India Company to the British Crown, by the Queen's Proclamation of 1858. Once the order was restored, the civil administration was re-established in the district which was named Unnao, with headquarters at Unnao. It assumed its present size in 1869. The same year the town of Unnao was constituted a Municipality. There were many rulers with a small estates ruled under the constituency of Unnao proclaimed by British Constituency during early 1900s till 1948 until India has been handed over to the interim government of 1948. Later, in 1956 the local throne was handed over to Pahadpur estate, one of the strongest estates in Unnao and had been ruled under Rao ShivBali Singh Bahadur Chauhan, who had served his country as a Royal Indian Army personnel in British rule. Later, in 1970s the custody of Unnao had been succeeded by his descendant and his very own son Rao Ramsajeevan Singh Bahadur Chauhan, who also had served his country in Royal Indian Army. He is blessed with 5 children, 2 daughters and 3 sons and had married to the daughter of Raja Bahadur Singh of Dalpatkheda estate. This history is in the Unnao book.

Surrounding towns
Unnao district is surrounded by some of the main cities of Uttar Pradesh – Lucknow, Kanpur, Raebareli and Hardoi.

Urban agglomeration

The Unnao urban agglomeration includes municipal limits of Unnao city and Shuklaganj, the villages of Unnao. Adarsh Nagar,P.D Nagar,Taki Nagar,Pitambar Nagar,P.N Kheda, Kalyani Devi,Daroga Bagh, Ibrahim Bagh,Qasim Nagar,Awas Vikas,Shiv Nagar, Singrosi, Civil Lines,Lok Nagar,Hiran Nagar and Jawahar Nagar etc is a well known Society of Unnao.Rural, Deeh, Dostinagar, Turkmannagar, Ganjauli, Singrosi, Shakpur, Magarwara, Akrampur, Galgalha, Sahjani, Maswasi, Haibatpur, Kathadal Narainpur, Dhaudhi Rautapur which together makes up the population of 303,224

Geography

Location and boundaries
The District is roughly a parallelogram in shape and lies between Latitude 26°8' N & 27°2' N and Longitude 80°3' E & 81°3' E. It is bounded on the North by District Hardoi, on the East by District Lucknow, on the South by District Rae Bareli and on the West by the Ganga which separates it from districts of Kanpur & Fatehpur.

River systems and water resources
The Ganga, Kalyani and Sai are the main rivers of the district, the former making its western and southern boundaries and the latter, for the greater part of its course, forming its northern & eastern boundaries. Among the other mainstreams of the district are Kalyani, the Tanai,  the Loni and the Morahi (Naurahi), all tributaries of the Ganga. These rivers generally run dry during the hot weather, but hold water during the greater part of the year and are utilized for irrigation.

Ganga
The only great river of the district is the Ganga which first touches the district near the village of Purwa Gahir, in pargana Bangarmau and flows south-eastward, separating this district from districts Kanpur and Fatehpur. Generally, it flows from north-west to the south-east, but it makes several sharp bends such as those near Umriya Bhagwantpur, and Rustampur in tehsil Safipur,   Rautapur in tehsil Unnao and Ratua Khera and Duli Khera in tehsil Purwa. The Ganga receives the Morahi near Baksar where it flows close to its old high bank. It leaves the district at a short distance from Baksar.

The river is not, however, put to much use either as a waterway or as a source of irrigation. There are several ferries for pedestrians and pilgrims but none of them approaches what may be termed a trade route. The river cannot, as a rule, be utilised for irrigation owing to the height of the bank but certain of its small drainage channels or sotas, which run island for a considerable distance in some parganas, are sometimes used to irrigate crops grown in low-lying alluvial lands. Otherwise, cultivated lands lie at great distances and cannot be irrigated from the river whose water would, in order to irrigate these lands, have to be passed through the sands on the sides of the river, and in the process be greatly washed, if not altogether absorbed. The main channel of the river is subject to constant variation and the cultivation in its immediate neighbourhood is, therefore of a shifting kind.

It appears from its old high bank that the river has a general tendency to shift its course to the west. In the days of Akbar, the river skirted the village of Ghatampur but has since then so altered its course that it now runs about 8  km to the south-west of this village.

Lakes
There is the unusually large number of  swamps & lakes of great size and value, particularly in the southern & eastern parts of the district. The larger lakes, which hold water all the year round, are the Kundra Samundar near Jhalotar, the lake near Nawabganj, the wide expanse of water near Kantha and the long chain of lakes in pargana Mauranwan. In Tehsil Safipur, the more important tanks are those at Mawai-Bhari and Kursat and the Harial Tal near Mustafabad. In Tehsil Hasanganj, besides the Kundra Samundar at Mawai, there are the Kulli Bani and Jalesar tanks near Ajgain and the chain of lakes called Basaha, which it seems, partakes of certain characteristics of a stream also, travelling a distance of 96 km in the district and eventually leaving it for district Rae Bareli where it is reckoned as a tributary of the river Sai. In the western part of the Tehsil are the Katgari lake near Asiwan and the stretches of water at Amarpur, Sambha, Sheothana, Marenda & Asakhera, but in its northern and eastern parts, there are only small and very shallow tanks which dry up when rainfall is deficient. In Tehsil Unnao there are no important lakes, but a number of very shallow depressions, which get filled up with water during the rains and yield excellent crop of rice.

In Tehsil Purwa there are many lakes, situated in a well-defined belt stretching along the whole length of the tehsil. The main among them are the lakes at Kantha, Bhadain, Unchagaon, Qila, Akhori, Miri, Zorawarganj and Sarwan. The Barhna tank near Sagauli, the Mohan and Sukrar lakes near Mauranwan, and several others, like the Bharda lake, skirting district Rae Bareli. Besides these, there are the tanks at Sahrawan, the Bhundi tank at Gulariha, and the Kumbha tank at Bhagwantnagar. The lakes at Kantha, Sagauli, and Barela contain water all the year round, while the others generally provide irrigation for the Rabi crops only, drying up in the years of drought. These lakes and tanks abound in fish, and singhara (water chestnut)  is very extensively grown in them.

Geology
Geologically the district forms part of the vast Indo-Gangetic alluvial tract, of which the origin is attributed to a sag in the earth's crust, formed, in the upper eocene times, between the northwardly drifting Gondwanaland and the rising Himalayan belt, and gradually filled in by sediments so as to constitute a level plane with a very gentle seaward slope. The alluvium formation of the district, comprising sand, silt & clay with occasional gravel, is of the early quaternary to sub-recent age. The older alluvium called bhangar, forms slightly elevated terraces usually above the flood levels. It is rather dark in colour generally rich in concretions and nodules of impure calcium carbonate, locally known as kankar. The newer alluvium, called khandar, forming the lowlands between the Ganga and Bhangar, is light coloured, poor in calcareous contain and composed of lenticular beds of sand, gravel and clays. The economic minerals found in the district are kankar, reh and sand.

Tourism
Unnao is famous for Panki - Godess Sita gave birth to Luv & Kush here and also, the famous Ashv from the Ashwa megh Yagya was caught and tied to a tree here by Luv & Kush.

Topology
Unnao lies in the great plains of the Ganges and hence the land is highly fertile. The soil is mostly alluvial.  The Ganges separates Unnao from Kanpur district. The district is bounded by river Ganges in the west and the river Sai in the east. The entire district falling in Sai Sub-basin of the Ganges basin represents flat topography. The irrigation in the district takes place through Sharda Canal network system and tubewells.
About 92% of the district area is under cultivation. The district has a subtropical climate. The district is mainly drained by the river Ganges and its tributaries Kalyani, Khar, Loni and Marahai in the western part of the district, and by Sai river in the eastern part of the district. All
these rivers are perennial in nature. About 87% area of the net sown area (3,00,000 hectares) is irrigated both by surface water (Sharda Canal network system) and ground water through shallow and moderately deep tubewells. The share of surface water irrigation
is 48% while that of ground water is 52%. The economy of the district mainly depends on agriculture.

Climate

Healthcare

Unnao hospital serves patients from nearby villages. The Uma Shankar Dikshit hospital is a government-run hospital located in A.B. Nagar near Ram Lila Ground. Another government hospital, which serves women, is located near the Unnao railway station. A medical college in the city is proposed. Trauma Center is proposed in government hospital.

There are 538 government health care facilities in the district, as can be seen from the table given below:

Economy
Tanning is the biggest industry in Unnao. Unnao is known for its leather industry and leather goods. Superhouse Group, Mirza Tanners, Rahman Exports, and Zamzam Tanners, Mahavir Spinfab Pvt. Ltd., ParashNath TechGarments Pvt. Ltd., Real enterprises (part of Baqai exports Gujarat) in large factories in Unnao. Banthar Leather Technology Park, Magarwara Industrial area and Unnao Industrial area developed by UPSIDC are major industrial suburbs of Unnao. Unnao is known for printing & dyeing for Lihaf (quilts) and mosquito net production and major producers are Haq and Sons Dyeing and Printing company and other major producers include F.R Dyeing and Printing Works.

Food
Unnao is known for its Samosas of Kachaudi Gali, Unnao, Chaat Munna ki chaat at Chota chauraha, Pav Bhaji,Dosa,Chole bhature of Manoranjan Restaurant.Matka Kala Jamuns,Gulab Jamuns of Chakalwansi Chauraha (18 km. from district centre).Anant Bhog Dhaba of Nawabganj of Unnao is also very famous for Dahi bhalle.Safipur is known for its special mangoes which are available only and only in season.Bangaramau is known for special All Type Food.

Education
The city consists of Engineering Colleges, Several Medical Colleges and Management Institutes along with Medium of Education being English and Hindi respectively. Schools include: Ben-Hur Inter College, Lucknow Public School, Saint Lawrence School, NBGEI Schools, Dr. Virendra Swaroop and Delhi Public School, Adarsh Vidya Mandir and Saraswati Vidya Mandir. Engineering Colleges are approved by AICTE and affiliated to Dr A P J Abdul Kalam Technical University, Lucknow. SARASWATI medical college a private medical college located in Sohramau is the only college available for higher medical education. Majority of the schools are affiliated to Uttar Pradesh Board but there are some which have affiliations to ICSE-ISC and CBSE.

Transport

Rail

Unnao is seamlessly connected through Indian Railways. Unnao railway station is the junction point for Rae Bareli, Unchahar, Kunda Harnamganj, Prayag, Allahabad, Hardoi, Balamau situated at Lucknow-Kanpur stretch. Trains for major cities like Agra, Ahmedabad, Bangalore, Bhopal, Nagpur, Vijaywada, Chennai, Coimbatore, Palakkad,  Bhubaneswar, Bhadrak, Cuttak, Chennai, Chandigarh, Chitrakoot, Cochin, Delhi, Gorakhpur, Ernakulam, Hyderabad, Jaipur, Jammu Tawi, Jhansi, Jalandhar, Amritsar, Panipat, Gorakhpur, Gwalior, Darbhanga, Kota, Mumbai, Nagpur, Patna, Puri, Surat, Trivandrum, Vadodara, Ujjain, Varanasi, Vadodara,  can be boarded here. The railway stations in Unnao Urban Agglomeration are:-
Unnao Railway Station- This is the major junction railway station in the city of Unnao and is connected to major cities of India with many express/mail trains.
Magarwara Railway Station-This is a passenger/EMU train station in the industrial suburb of Magarwara.
Sonik Railway Station-This is a railway station towards East of Unnao city near UPSIDC Industrial Area and has only passenger/EMU trains stoppage.
Kanpur Bridge Left Bank Station- This is a station within the municipal limits of Shuklaganj, the twin city of Unnao and has only passenger/EMU stoppage.

Kanpur Lucknow High Speed Railway

Unnao will be the only railway station between Kanpur and Lucknow of the planned high speed railways.

Road

The major national highway NH 25 passes through Unnao which has bypass from Unnao.  The State Highway which is 78 km encompasses Unnao is in good condition. Lucknow-Agra Expressway India's longest access-controlled expressway passes through Unnao district. It is a six lane expressway. Ganga expressway will also pass through unnao which will enhance connectivity with national capital.

Air

The nearest airport is Kanpur Airport towards west (approx. 25 km) and Lucknow Airport towards east (approx. 50 km)

Inner city transport
The city has transport likes auto-rickshaw and E-rickshaw (By-Pass to Tempo Stand (Kanpur),  Pedal rickshaws and Sub Metropolitan city buses and economical cross overs like Endeavour, Scorpio, Innova, Bolero etc. which are privately run. Kanpur Metropolitan Bus Service has started operating fully air conditioned electric  buses from Unnao Taxi stand (Gandhi nagar tiraha) to Kanpur Bada chauraha via Magawara and Shuklaganj which will help in fast transit from unnao to kanpur.

Notable people

Unnao has been known as the land of pen (kalam) and sword (talwaar). It has been the land of Progressive Hindi writers, freedom fighters, educationists etc.
Suryakant Tripathi 'Nirala'
Chandrashekhar Azad
Maulana Hasrat Mohani
Christine Weston
Hussain Ahmed Madani
Sarvadaman D. Banerjee
Bhagwati Charan Verma
Shivmangal Singh 'Suman'
Vishwambhar Dayal Tripathi
Ram Vilas Sharma
Dwarka Prasad Mishra
Gulab Singh Lodhi
Deepak Tripathi
Ram Baksh Singh 
chandra-bhushan-singh
Shukh Vilas Bajpai
Hriday Narayan Dikshit
Ziaur Rahman Ansari, union minister
Uma Shankar Dikshit
Sheila Dikshit, former Chief Minister of Delhi, daughter in law of Uma Shankar Dikshit
Vishal Mishra, music director and singer
Annu Tandon, former Member of Parliament
Kuldeep Yadav, China Man Bowler Of Team India (INTERNATIONAL

References
1.https://m.timesofindia.com/city/lucknow/up-now-home-to-8-ramsar-wetlands/amp_articleshow/79253169.cms

External links
 
The Local City Guide Of Unnao
 Local News Of Unnao

 
Cities and towns in Unnao district
Cities in Uttar Pradesh